Srem is a region of Serbia and Croatia.

Srem may also refer to:

In Serbia 
 Srem District
 FK Srem, a football club
 Eparchy of Srem, within the Serbian Orthodox Church
 Roman Catholic Diocese of Srem
 Sanjak of Srem (Ottoman-era)
 Kingdom of Srem (mediaeval)

Elsewhere 
 Śrem, several places in Poland
 Srem (village), a village in Bulgaria
 Srem Gap, in Antarctica

See also 
 Syrmia (disambiguation)